Protoelongata dekkersi is a species of sea snail, a marine gastropod mollusk, in the family Costellariidae, the ribbed miters.

References

 Herrmann M., Stossier G. & Salisbury R.A. (2014) A new subgenus including three new species of the genus Vexillum (Gastropoda: Costellariidae) from the central Indo-Pacific with remarks on Vexillum (Pusia) semicostatum (Anton, 1838). Contributions to Natural History 24: 1–55

Costellariidae